Valdemar António Almeida (born 9 March 1992), known as Paná, is an Angolan professional footballer who plays for Portuguese club Académico Viseu as a midfielder.

Football career
On 11 August 2013, Pana made his professional debut with Marítimo B in a 2013–14 Segunda Liga match against Sporting Covilhã.

International goals
Scores and results list Angola's goal tally first.

References

External links

Stats and profile at LPFP 

1992 births
Living people
Angolan footballers
Association football midfielders
G.D. Tourizense players
C.S. Marítimo players
G.D. Chaves players
Académico de Viseu F.C. players
Leixões S.C. players
Liga Portugal 2 players
Campeonato de Portugal (league) players
Angolan expatriate footballers
Expatriate footballers in Portugal
Angolan expatriate sportspeople in Portugal
Angola international footballers